(born 1956) is a Japanese illustrator.  For his career contribution to "children's and young adult literature in the broadest sense" he won the Astrid Lindgren Memorial Award from the Swedish Arts Council in 2005, the largest cash prize in children's literature.

Life

Arai was born in Yamagata in 1956 and educated at Nihon University Yamagata Junior & Senior High School. He studied art at Nihon University and he lives in Tokyo. His first published work was the picture book Melody in 1990. That year he won the "Grand Award for new illustrators" (quoting the Swedish Arts Council).

See also

References

https://web.archive.org/web/20070206050355/http://brooks.d.carambole.com/overview/fileobjects/Biblio_RA_e.pdf

Further reading
 The Astrid Lindgren Memorial Award booklet: Philip Pullman / Ryoji Arai, Statens Kulturråd, Stockholm, 2005, 12 pp (unpaginated)

External links
 J'Lit | Authors : Ryoji Arai | Books from Japan 
 Ryouzi Arai at Amazon
  (March 2014, perhaps no catalog records; none as "Arai, Ryōji, 1956-")

Japanese children's book illustrators
Astrid Lindgren Memorial Award winners
Nihon University alumni
1956 births
Living people
Date of birth missing (living people)
Writers from Yamagata Prefecture